Kristina Akheeva is an Australian actress and model. She made her Bollywood debut with 2013 film Yamla Pagla Deewana 2, followed by Telugu film Galipatam which released in 2014. She debuted in Kannada in an Upendra classic Uppi 2.

Early life
Kristina was born in Khabarovsk, Russia, to Russian parents. At age 7, Kristina moved to Australia, where she spent the rest of her school life. At 21, a modelling agent in Singapore offered her a 3-month modelling contract, she accepted and spent 6 years working as a model and living in 6 different countries including India.

Career
Akheeva had studied acting at the Film and TV Academy in Melbourne Australia, before becoming a full-time model. She spent 6 years Modeling around the world and living in  6 different countries. She had done campaigns for brands such as Palmolive, Sunsilk, Vaseline lotion, dish TV  and was the face of many fashion and jewellery brands worldwide.

While in India for a modelling contract she auditioned for the lead role opposite Sunny Deol in Sangeeth Sivan's action comedy Yamla Pagla Deewana 2. Looking for a foreign face, the filmmakers chose her  and she took a break from modelling. In August 2012 her casting was confirmed. During the filming she worked on her Hindi and dubbed for herself. Writing for The Hindu, Anuj Kumar opined that Akheeva "[seemed] suitable to play [Sunny's] daughter". He criticised the film and called its plot "nonsensical". Deol's father Dharmendra who also played an important role in the film said that he wanted " to play [Deol's] character so that I could have romanced her.".

In 2014 she made her Tollywood debut with Galipatam. Directed by debutante Naveen Gandhi. Akheeva garnered praise for her performance, Tollywood times wrote, "She is one girl to watch out for. Although she is from Australia, she eases comfortably into the part of an Indian girl. Her performance was brilliant. She is a well-trained actress and will soon reach more heights in Telugu Cinema.". Akheeva has also acted in a lead role for a new Kannada movie named Uppi2 opposite Upendra. The film is a bilingual released in Kannada and Telugu, the movie has set the record for being highest rated movie in the world. She is also a trained salsa dancer. During India International Jewellery Week 2013, she was the showstopper for Anmol jewellers and in 2014 IIJW. she was the showstopper for  D Navinchandra.

Filmography

References

External links

 
 

Year of birth missing (living people)
Living people
People from Khabarovsk
Russian female models
Russian film actresses
Russian emigrants to Australia
Australian female models
Australian film actresses
Australian people of Russian descent
Australian expatriate actresses in India
Actresses in Hindi cinema
Actresses in Telugu cinema
Actresses in Kannada cinema
European actresses in India
Actresses of European descent in Indian films
21st-century Russian actresses
21st-century Australian actresses